The following are the dams and reservoirs located in Assam:

References

 
Assam
Assam
Dams
Lists of tourist attractions in Assam